Locking Up Our Own: Crime and Punishment in Black America is a 2017 book by James Forman Jr. on support for the 1970s War on Crime from Black leaders in American cities. It won the 2018 Pulitzer Prize for General Nonfiction and the Lillian Smith Book Award.

References

Further reading

External links 
 

2017 non-fiction books
Pulitzer Prize for General Non-Fiction-winning works
Farrar, Straus and Giroux books
English-language books
Books about race and ethnicity
History books about ethnic groups
Politics and race in the United States
Race and crime in the United States
African-American society
History books about the United States
American history books